The Den Helder Suns are a professional basketball club based in Den Helder, Netherlands. The club was founded in 2016 and currently plays in the BNXT League. The team has played at the highest domestic level since  years. The Suns play their home games in the Sporthal Sportlaan, which has a capacity of 1,000 people.

History
After the bankruptcy of the Netherlands' professional BV Den Helder team during the 2013–14 season, a professional basketball representative team from Den Helder was missing for three seasons. In 2016, the Suns organisation was founded with the goal of making a return to the Dutch Basketball League (DBL). On June 30, 2017, Den Helder Suns announced it would return to the highest level in the 2017–18 season. On July 14, 2017, the Suns announced "Peter van Noord head coach Den Helder Suns."

In its first DBL season, Suns finished in the eight place of the regular season, above last-placed BAL. Captain Tjoe de Paula, who played for different clubs from Den Helder before, got his number retired on 19 April 2018.

Since the 2021–22 season, the Suns play in the BNXT League, in which the national leagues of Belgium and the Netherlands have been merged.

Season by season

Players

Retired numbers
On 19 April 2018, Suns retired its first number as Tjoe de Paula was honored, who played for BV Den Helder during the periods 2001–2003, 2004–2006, 2008–2009 and 2017–18.

Current roster

Notable players

Individual awards

DBL Rookie of the Year
Boyd van der Vuurst de Vries – 2018
Boy van Vliet – 2019

DBL MVP Under 23
Boyd van der Vuurst de Vries – 2018
DBL Most Improved Player
Stan van den Elzen – 2021

Top scorers by season
The following players were the leading scorers for Den Helder in each DBL season:

Head coaches

Notes

References

External links 
 Official website (in Dutch)
 Eurobasket.com Den Helder Suns Page

Basketball teams established in 2016
2016 establishments in the Netherlands
Dutch Basketball League teams
Sport in Den Helder
BV Den Helder
Basketball teams in the Netherlands